The Tayside derby is a football rivalry based in Tayside. The matches are contested by the three professional clubs in the region: Dundee, Dundee United and St Johnstone.

A match between Dundee and Dundee United, whose grounds are in the same street, is referred to as a Dundee derby. St Johnstone are based in Perth, 20 miles from Dundee.

In seasons where all local derby matches were traditionally held on the same weekend (including at New Year), the Dundee derby would take precedence if all three clubs were in the same league, and any uneven number of Tayside teams would lead to one usually playing Aberdeen, who had no closer rivals geographically.

Followers of the Dundee clubs generally consider their city rivalry as far more important than any relationship with St Johnstone, with Dundee captain Charlie Adam stating in 2021 prior to a Scottish Cup tie with the Saints that there was no such thing as a Tayside derby; opposing goalkeeper Zander Clark did not refute this outright but highlighted the increased travelling support typically brought to each ground for matches due to the close distance between Perth and Dundee, bringing more local interest into league fixtures particularly in seasons where the Dundee clubs are in different divisions and no city derbies are played.

Achievements
Between them, the three clubs have won thirteen major trophies (as well as finishing runners-up/beaten finalists 26 times across the three competitions), with St Johnstone's three triumphs all the most recent, but they are still behind the Dundee clubs who have each won four cups and one national league championship.

In the season following their title wins, the Dundee clubs each progressed to the semi-final stage of the European Cup (Dundee in 1962–63, United in 1983–84). Dundee also reached the semi-finals of the 1967–68 Inter-Cities Fairs Cup, while Dundee United were runners-up in the 1987 UEFA Cup Final. St Johnstone have never made a major impact in European football, although they qualified for Europe six times between 2014 and 2021, more than either Dundee club managed in the 21st century.

All three clubs have endured spells in the second tier, but St Johnstone are the only club to have dropped into the third tier for a short period. Between them, they have won the second tier championship 14 times, and have lifted the minor Scottish Challenge Cup on four occasions up to 2017–18.

Achievements by Tayside clubs
Up to and including season 2022–23.

Dundee United vs St Johnstone

First meeting: 23 September 1911, 1911–12 Scottish Division Two

Perhaps the most famous meeting between the Terrors and the Saints was the 2014 Scottish Cup Final at Celtic Park, won 2–0 by St Johnstone 
to secure the first major trophy in their long history.

In 1991, the clubs met in the semi-final stage of the same tournament, Dundee United winning that match at East End Park to set up a final against Motherwell which they lost 4–3 after extra time.

Results table
As of: 18 February 2023.

Dundee vs St Johnstone

First meeting: 4 October 1924, 1924–25 Scottish Division One

The two clubs met in the semi-final of the 1967–68 Scottish League Cup at Tannadice. Dundee won 3–1, but went on to lose the final to Celtic. St Johnstone also lost out (in a replay) at the same stage of that season's Scottish Cup to eventual winners Dunfermline Athletic.

Prior to that, Dundee's greatest triumph – winning the 1961–62 Scottish Division One, the only league title in their history – also involved heartbreak for St Johnstone, as the Dark Blues, needing only a draw to secure the championship,  won 3–0 at Muirton Park on the final day, a result which saw the home club relegated on goal average.

Saints gained a small form of revenge many years later, with both teams in the second tier, when they won 1–0 at Dens Park to all but confirm their return to the top flight by winning the 2008–09 Scottish First Division (it was not mathematically certain at that point, although they eventually held a 10-point margin by the season's end).

Results table

As of: 23 April 2022.

Dundee United vs Dundee

First meeting: 21 November 1925, 1925–26 Scottish Division One

The city rivals contested the 1980 Scottish League Cup Final, held at Dens Park after lots were drawn. United's 3–0 victory was one of the early signs of them becoming a force in Scottish football along with Aberdeen, with the two clubs' spell of success and relative geographical proximity leading to them being dubbed the New Firm, challenging Glasgow's Old Firm. Previously existing in Dundee's shadow, the United team built by Jim McLean had won the previous edition of the League Cup too,  their victory over Aberdeen also played at Dens in a replay after a draw at Hampden Park; Paul Sturrock was a scorer in both years. 

Dundee United would win the league title in 1983, and once again it was Dens Park which was the scene of their victory, winning 2–1 over Dundee thanks to a memorable chipped goal from Ralph Milne to top the table by one point from Celtic and Aberdeen. They also came out on top 3–2 in the semi-final of the 1986–87 Scottish Cup between the teams played at Tynecastle Park, although lost the final to St Mirren.

The Tangerines''' good fortune at Dens Park ran out in May 2016, however, as Dundee won the city derby 2–1 to confirm United's descent to the second tier.

Results tableAs of: 9 April 2022.Totals for three teamsAs of: 18 February 2023.''

Notes

References

External links
Soccerbase:
 Matches between Dundee and St Johnstone
 Matches between Dundee United and St Johnstone
 Matches between Dundee United and Dundee

Scotland football derbies
Dundee United F.C.
Dundee F.C.
St Johnstone F.C.
Football in Dundee
Sport in Perth, Scotland
Recurring sporting events established in 1911
Football in Perth and Kinross